Slavonia may refer to:

 Slavonia, geographical and historical region in modern Croatia
 Banate of Slavonia, medieval province of the Kingdom of Hungary
 Kingdom of Slavonia, early modern province of the Habsburg Monarchy
 SS Slavonia, several ships

See also
 Eastern Slavonia (disambiguation)
 Western Slavonia (disambiguation)
 Slavonian (disambiguation)

Regions of Croatia
Slavonia